Startup commonly refers to:
 Startup company,  a newly emerged, fast-growing business

Startup or start-up may also refer to:

 Booting, an initialization period that computers and electronics go through when first turned on
 Project commissioning, the act of starting for the first time a technical installation
 Sign-on, when broadcasters start transmissions on a day

Geography
 Startup, Washington, a census-designated place in Snohomish County, Washington

Film and TV
 Start-Ups: Silicon Valley, a reality television series about startup companies that premiered in 2012
 Startup.com, a 2001 documentary film about the dot-com start-up phenomenon
 Start Up (2013 TV series), a 2013 American docuseries that aired in PBS
 StartUp (TV series), an American television drama series from 2016 with Martin Freeman and Ron Perlman that was released on Crackle
 StartUp (podcast), American podcast from Gimlet Media hosted by Alex Blumberg and Lisa Chow
 Start-Up (film), a 2019 South Korean film written and directed by Choi Jung-yeol
 Start-Up (South Korean TV series), a 2020 South Korean television drama series
 Start-Up PH, a Philippine television drama series based on the South Korean drama of the same name

Other
 Start-Up (video game), a 2000 video game
 Startups.co.uk, a British website
 "Startup!", a 2014 song by South Korean boy band Boyfriend
"Start Up", song by Ikara Colt
"Start Up", song by Steve Swell
"Start Up", song by Scott 4 (band)